Jim Pomeroy may refer to:

 Jim Pomeroy (motorcyclist) (1952–2006), professional motocross racer
 Jim Pomeroy (politician) (born 1936), North Dakota Democratic-NPL Party member of the North Dakota Senate
 Jim Pomeroy (artist) (1945–1992), American artist